Escuela Agrícola Cristo Obrero is a Catholic Chilean high school located in Graneros, Cachapoal Province, Chile. Since 2017 it has been free at the point of use and is funded by the Church and voluntary donations.

The school's website describes its mission with the following words: "The Escuela Agrícola Cristo Obrero is an educational community that collaborates with the mission of the diocesan Catholic Church, to educate young people in the faith and to enable them to identify and assume their rights and responsibilities."

References 

Educational institutions established in 1954
1954 establishments in Chile
Secondary schools in Chile
Schools in Cachapoal Province